Marble House is a Gilded Era mansion in Newport, Rhode Island

Marble House may also refer to:

Marble House (song), a song by the Knife

Places
Jerome Marble House, Worcester, Massachusetts, listed on the National Register of Historic Places 
Thomas Marble Quarry Houses, West Whiteland, Pennsylvania
Marble House, Berlin, a German cinema

See also
Marble Schoolhouse, Eastchester, New York, listed on the National Register of Historic Places in Westchester County, New York
Marble Palace (disambiguation)